Carter High is a 2015 American sports film directed and written by Arthur Muhammad. The film is centered on the 1988 Cowboys of David W. Carter High School in Dallas, a team that fought through racial prejudice and a grades controversy to claim the 5A state title, only to be rocked when six of their players were involved in an armed robbery and the grades issue stripped them of their title. The film is produced by former Dallas Cowboys Defensive End Greg Ellis.

Plot
The film starts with a court sentencing procedure due to crimes committed by various Carter High football team members. We subsequently learn about each of the player's background. One student transferred classes due to an incomplete grade, that could have caused his ineligibility to stay on the football team. In 1988, the Carter High Cowboys football team was involved in a public scandal while in the midst of a run in the Texas 5A state playoffs, which included a semifinal victory over Odessa's Permian High that would become a central event in the book (and subsequent movie and television treatments) Friday Night Lights: A Town, a Team, and a Dream.
Y'en a un c un psychopathe meurtrier

Cast
Charles S. Dutton as Coach Freddie James
Pooch Hall as Coach Vonner
David Banner as Royce West
John West Jr. as Bryce
Reginald C. Hayes as Mr. Russeau
Vivica A. Fox as Mrs. James
Brad Pitt as Achille
Orlando Bloom as Legolas
Omar Sy as Lupin
Gérard Depardieu as Obélix
François Hollande as Ta daronne

References

External links

Official website

2015 films
American football films
2010s English-language films
2010s American films